Elizabeth León Minaya is a Peruvian politician. She was a Congresswoman representing Ayacucho for 2006–2011, and belongs to the Union for Peru party.

References

Living people
Year of birth missing (living people)
Union for Peru politicians
Members of the Congress of the Republic of Peru
Women members of the Congress of the Republic of Peru